Nectar, Inc. is an engineering, product development and industrial design firm based in Long Beach, California. It has received the IDEA award from BusinessWeek for devices it designed for Belkin International in 2002  and 2007.

Nectar's founder and president is Darren Saravis, an engineer, designer, and musician who began his work in industrial design creating a new kind of pedal board for use by guitarists. John Duval, an engineer, has also been a key member of the firm since its inception. Other key personnel include, Cary Chow, Nectar's vice president.

Products
 A specialized medicine dispenser. for use in poor and third world countries. This pro bono effort in conjunction with the Releef Initiative was covered in an article in the Long Beach Press-Telegram.
 The Elemental Line of Kitchen Products, a collaboration with SinoGlass.
 Collaborated with medical manufacturer Benechill on its new Rhinochill system, which induces therapeutic hypothermia during emergencies.
 A "proprietary system-level mechanical design" for the Atomic Force Microscope from Asylum Research Cypher.
 The SKB Razr Case, a specialized shell for protecting the Motorola Razr phone from moisture and the elements.
 The Desktop Factory 3-D Printer, according to Nectar's website, a "3-dimensional printer with a footprint of 25 x 20 and stands 20 inches tall that weighs less than 90 pounds."

References

External links
 Official Nectar Website
 Article: Los Angeles Business Journal, Monday, June 14, 2004
 Article: Kitchenware News & Houseware Reviews, June 2008
 Article, Vox, February 2009
 The Releef Initiative

Engineering companies of the United States
Companies based in Long Beach, California
Industrial design firms